Triisopropanolamine is an amine used for a variety of industrial applications including as an emulsifier, stabilizer, and chemical intermediate. It is also used to neutralize acidic components of some herbicides.

See also
 1-Amino-2-propanol
 Diisopropanolamine

References

Amines